The Trinity Evangelical Lutheran Church in Abilene, Kansas is affiliated with the Evangelical Lutheran Church in America. It is listed on the National Register of Historic Places.

Its sanctuary is a  red brick building upon a limestone foundation which was completed in 1878.  Additions in 1907 and 1932 expanded the building.  A 1973 one-story building is connected by a walkway.

References

External links

Prairie Wind Parish (ELCA)

Lutheran churches in Kansas
Churches on the National Register of Historic Places in Kansas
Buildings and structures in Dickinson County, Kansas
National Register of Historic Places in Dickinson County, Kansas